Sean Brian Anstee  (born July 1987) is an English Conservative Party politician and businessman. He was formerly the Leader of the Council on Trafford council and between 2008 and 2021 was a Councillor for the Bowdon ward. Anstee is also executive director at Municipal Partners, Chairman of Trafford Housing Trust and a Non-Executive Director of London & Quadrant.  He was appointed a CBE in the 2019 New Year Honours list for services to local government.

He stood as the Conservative candidate for Mayor of Greater Manchester in the 2017 election, achieving 128,752 votes (22.7%) and coming second behind Labour's Andy Burnham.

Anstee grew up on a council estate in Partington, and attended Broadoak School, leaving aged 16 to take up an apprenticeship at Barclays in Timperley. He joined BNY Mellon in 2009. He later graduated from Manchester Metropolitan University in 2013 with a degree in business. He  represented Bowdon on the council from 2008 to 2021 when he retired. He became Leader of the council in February 2014. At age 26, he was the youngest council leader in the UK.

References 

1987 births
Living people
Commanders of the Order of the British Empire
Conservative Party (UK) councillors
Councillors in Trafford
English LGBT politicians
Leaders of local authorities of England
Members of the Greater Manchester Combined Authority